The 1986 French Figure Skating Championships took place in Franconville for singles and pairs and in Lyon for ice dance. Skaters competed in the disciplines of men's singles, women's singles, pair skating, and ice dancing on the senior level. The event was used to help determine the French team to the 1986 World Championships and the 1986 European Championships.

Results

Men

Ladies

Pairs

Ice dance

External links
 French article

1985 in figure skating
French Figure Skating Championships, 1986
French Figure Skating Championships
1986 in French sport